The  Eastern League season began on approximately April 1 and the regular season ended on approximately September 1. 

The New Hampshire Fisher Cats defeated the Altoona Curve 3 games to 0 to win the Eastern League Championship Series.

Regular season

Standings

Notes:
Green shade indicates that team advanced to the playoffs
Bold indicates that team advanced to ELCS
Italics indicates that team won ELCS

Statistical league leaders

Batting leaders

Pitching leaders

Playoffs

Divisional Series

Northern Division
The New Hampshire Fisher Cats defeated the Binghamton Mets in the Northern Division playoffs 3 games to 1.

Southern Division
The Altoona Curve defeated the Erie SeaWolves in the Southern Division playoffs 3 games to 0.

Championship Series
The New Hampshire Fisher Cats defeated the Altoona Curve in the ELCS 3 games to 0.

References

External links
2004 Eastern League Review at thebaseballcube.com

Eastern League seasons